Crepidula intratesta is a species of sea snail, a marine gastropod mollusc in the family Calyptraeidae, the slipper snails or slipper limpets, cup-and-saucer snails, and Chinese hat snails.

Description
The maximum recorded shell length is 40 mm.

Habitat
Minimum recorded depth is 16 m. Maximum recorded depth is 47 m.

References

External links

Calyptraeidae
Gastropods described in 2006